Hemanta Mukhopadhyay (16 June 1920 – 26 September 1989), known professionally as Hemant Kumar and Hemanta Mukherjee, was a legendary Indian music director and playback singer who primarily sang in Bengali and Hindi, as well as other Indian languages like Marathi, Gujarati, Odia, Assamese, Tamil, Punjabi, Bhojpuri, Konkani, Sanskrit and Urdu. He was an artist of Bengali and Hindi film music, Rabindra Sangeet, and many other genres. He was the recipient of two National Awards for Best Male Playback Singer and was popularly known as the "voice of God".

Early life and education
Hemanta was born in Varanasi, in the house of his maternal grandfather who was a physician. His paternal family originated from the town of Jaynagar Majilpur, and migrated to Kolkata
in the early 1900s. Hemanta grew up and attended the Nasiruddin School and later the Mitra
Institution school in the Bhowanipore area, where he met his longtime friend Subhas Mukhopadhyay
who later became a Bengali poet. He also developed a friendship with the noted
writer Santosh Kumar Ghosh during his studies.

Hemanta joined the Bengal Technical Institute at Jadavpur (now Jadavpur University) to pursue Engineering Diploma. However, he quit academics due to health problem and to pursue a career in music, despite objections from his father. He experimented with literature and published a short story in a Bengali magazine Desh, however he focused on music by the late 1930's.

Early music career
Hemanta's first film song was in the Bengali film Rajkumarer Nirbbasan released in 1940 which was scored by S.D. Burman. This was followed by Nimai Sanyas in 1941, in which music was scored by Hariprasanna Das. Hemanta's first compositions for himself were the Bengali non-film songs "Katha Kayonako Shudhu Shono" and "Amar Biraha Akashe Priya" in 1943. The lyrics were by Amiya Bagchi. 

His first Hindi film songs were in Meenakshi in 1942. followed by Irada in 1944, with music composed by Amar Nath. 
Hemanta is considered the foremost exponent of Rabindra Sangeet. His first recorded Rabindra Sangeet was in the Bengali film Priya Bandhabi (1944). The song was "Pather Sesh Kothaye". He recorded his first non-film Rabindra Sangeet disc in 1944 under the Columbia label. The songs were "Aamar Aar Habe Na Deri" and "Keno Pantha E Chanchalata". Prior to that, he had recorded the song "Aamaar mallikabone " on All India Radio/Akashvani but, unfortunately, the record has passed into oblivion.

His first movie as a music director was the Bengali film Abhiyatri in 1947. Although many of the songs Hemanta recorded during this time received critical acclaim, major commercial success eluded him until 1947. Some contemporary male singers of Hemanta in Bengali were Jaganmay Mitra, Robin Majumdar, Satya Chowdhury, Dhananjay Bhattacharya, Sudhirlal Chakraborty, Bechu Dutta and Talat Mahmood.

Family
Hemanta had three brothers and a sister Nilima. His younger brother Tarajyoti was a Bengali short story writer. His youngest brother Amal composed music as well as sang for some Bengali movies, most notably for Abak Prithibi and Hospital. Amal recorded a few songs in the 1960's as well with Hemant as music director, most notably the song Jiboner Anekta Path Eklai. In 1945, Hemanta married Bela Mukherjee, a singer from Bengal. Although she had sung some popular songs in the movie Kashinath, she did not actively pursue her musical career after marriage. They had two children, a son Jayant, and a daughter Ranu. Ranu also pursued a music career in the late 1960's and early 1970's, with somewhat limited success. Jayant is married to Moushumi Chatterjee, a Bengali film actress.

Success and migration to Mumbai
 

In the mid-1940s, Hemanta became an active member of the Indian People's Theatre Association (IPTA) and started an association with another active IPTA member — songwriter and composer Salil Chowdhury. One of the main driving forces behind the establishment of IPTA was the Bengal famine of 1943 and the inaction of the British administration and wealthy Indians to prevent it.
In 1947, Hemanta recorded a non-film song called "Ganyer badhu" ("The rural bride") that had music and lyrics by Salil Chowdhury. The six-minute song recorded on two sides of a 78 rpm disc was sung at a varying pace and lacked the conventional structure and romantic theme of a Bengali song. It depicted an idyllic, prosperous and caring rural woman's life and family and how it gets ravaged by the demons of famine and ensuing poverty. This song generated an unforeseen popularity for Hemanta and Salil in eastern India and, in a way, established Hemanta ahead of his male contemporaries. Hemanta and Salil paired again in several songs over the next few years. Almost all these songs proved to be very popular.[6]

Around the same period, Hemanta started receiving more assignments for music composition for Bengali films. Some were for director Hemen Gupta. When Hemen moved to Mumbai a few years later, he called upon Hemanta to compose music for his first directorial venture in Hindi titled Anandmath under the Filmistan banner. Responding to this call, Hemanta migrated to Mumbai in 1951 and joined Filmistan Studios. To remain linked to his roots, he named his new house which he built in Mumbai's Khar after one of his favorite works of Gurudev Rabindranath Tagore, Gitanjali. The music of Anand Math (1952) was a moderate success. Perhaps, the most notable song from this movie is 'Vande mataram' sung by Lata Mangeshkar, which Hemanta set to a marching tune.

Following Anandamath, Hemanta scored music for a few Filmistan movies like Shart in subsequent years, the songs of which received moderate popularity. Simultaneously, Hemanta gained popularity in Mumbai as a playback singer.[7] His songs for actor Dev Anand under the music direction of S. D. Burman in movies like Jaal (1952) ("Yeh Raat Yeh Chandni Phir Kahan"), [[[House No. 44]] (1955) ("Chup Hai Dharti" and "Teri Duniya Mein Jeene Se"), Solva Saal (1958) ("Hai Apna Dil To Awara"), and Baat Ek Raat Ki (1962) ("Na Tum Humen Jano"), attained popularity. In the 1950s, he also play-backed for other heroes of Hindi films like Pradeep Kumar (Nagin, Detective) and Sunil Dutt (Duniya Jhukti Hain) and later in the 1960s for Biswajeet (Bees Saal Baad, Bin Badal Barsaat, Kohra) and Dharmendra (Anupama); he was the music composer for all these films.

Career rise
By the mid-1950s, Hemanta had consolidated his position as a prominent singer and composer. In Bengal, he was one of the foremost exponents of Rabindra Sangeet and perhaps the most sought-after male singer. In a ceremony organized by Hemanta Mukherjee to honor Debabrata Biswas (1911–1980), the legendary Rabindra Sangeet exponent, in Calcutta in March 1980, Debabrata Biswas unhesitatingly mentioned Hemanta as "the second hero" to popularise
Rabindra Sangeet, the first being the legendary Pankaj Kumar Mallick. In Mumbai, along with playback singing, Hemanta carved a niche as a composer. He composed music for a Hindi film called Nagin (1954) which became a major success owing largely to its music. Songs of Nagin remained chart-toppers continuously for two years and culminated in Hemanta receiving the prestigious Filmfare Best Music Director Award in 1955. The very same year, he scored music for a Bengali movie called Shapmochan in which he played back four songs for the Bengali actor Uttam Kumar. This started a long partnership between Hemanta and Uttam as a playback singer-actor pair. They were the most popular singer-actor duo in Bengali cinema over the next decade.

In the latter part of the 1950s, Hemanta composed music and sang for several Bengali and Hindi films, recorded several Rabindra Sangeet and Bengali non-film songs. Almost all of these, especially his Bengali songs, became very popular. This period can be seen as the zenith of his career and lasted for almost a decade. Salil Chowdhury and Lata Mangeshkar stated Hemanta as the Voice Of God. He sang songs composed by the major music directors in Bengal such as Nachiketa Ghosh, Robin Chatterjee and Salil Chowdhury. Some of the notable films Hemanta himself composed music for during this period include Harano Sur, Marutirtha Hinglaj, Neel Akasher Neechey, Lukochuri, Swaralipi, Deep Jwele Jaai, Shesh Parjanta, Kuhak, Dui Bhai, and Saptapadi in Bengali, and Jagriti and Ek Hi Raasta in Hindi.

Movie production
In the late 1950s, Hemanta ventured into movie production under his own banner: Hemanta-Bela productions. The first movie under this banner was a Bengali film directed by Mrinal Sen, titled Neel Akasher Neechey (1959). The story was based on the travails of a Chinese street hawker in
[Calcutta]] in the backdrop of India's freedom struggle. The movie went on to win the President's Gold Medal — the highest honour for a movie from Government of India. In the next decade, Hemanta's production company was renamed Geetanjali productions and it produced several Hindi movies such as Bees Saal Baad, Kohraa, Biwi Aur Makaan, Faraar, Rahgir and Khamoshi all of which had music by Hemanta. Only Bees Saal Baad and Khamoshi were major commercial successes.

Back in Bengal, Hemanta scored music for a movie titled Palatak in 1963 where he experimented with merging Bengal folk music and light music. This proved to be a major success and Hemanta's composition style changed noticeably for many of his future films in Bengal such as Baghini, and Balika Badhu. In Bengali films Manihar and Adwitiya, both of which were major musical as well as commercial successes, his compositions had a light classical tinge. In 1961, for commemorating Rabindranath Tagore's birth centenary, the Gramophone Company of India
featured Rabindrasangeet by Hemanta in a large portion of its commemorative output. This too proved to be a major commercial success. Hemanta went on several overseas concert tours including his trip to the West Indies. Overall, in the 1960s decade, he retained his position as the major male singer in Bengal and as a composer and singer to be reckoned with in Hindi films.

In the 1960s he was the predominant and lead male voice in many of Tagore's musical dramas like Valmiki Pratibha, Shyama, Sapmochan, Chitrangada and Chandalika. With Kanika Bandopadhyay (1924–2000) and Suchitra Mitra (1924–2010), who were the lead female voices in these, he was part of the Rabindra Sangeet triumvirate that was popular and respected. It was referred to as 'Hemanta-Kanika-Suchitra' and, with Debabrata Biswas, this quartet was and continues to be the most heard exponents of Tagore compositions. Asoktaru Bandopadhyay, Chinmoy Chattopadhyay, Sagar Sen, Sumitra Sen, and Ritu Guha were the other leading exponents of Rabindra Sangeet at that time.

Later career
In the 1970s, Hemanta's contribution to Hindi films was nominal. He scored music for a handful
of his home productions, but none of these movies were successful nor their music. In Bengal,
however, he remained the foremost exponent of Rabindra Sangeet, film and non-film songs. His
output continued to be popular for most of the decade. Some of them are Jodi jante chao tumi...
(1972), Ek gochha rajanigandha, Aamay prasno kore nil dhrubatara..., Sedin tomay dekhechilam...
(1974), Khirki theke singho duar... (Stree, 1971), Ke jane ko ghonta... (Sonar Khancha, 1974),
Jeona daraon bandhu... (Phuleswari, 1975 ) and popularised Rabindra sangeet using them
beautifully in films as per situations. A very popular and classic example is the song Chorono
dhorite diyogo amare.. in Dadar Kirti (1980). In 1971, Hemanta debuted as a film director in for his
self-produced Bengali movie Anindita. It didn't fare exceedingly well at the box office. However,
his rendition Diner seshe ghumer deshe was one of his best and popular Rabindra Sangeet renditions. In the same year Hemanta went to Hollywood by responding to film director  [[Conrad
Rooks]]  and score the music of Conrad's Siddhartha and played back  O Nadire... (composed and
sang by him earlier in Neel Aakasher Neechey(1959) in that film. He was the first Indian singer to playback
in Hollywood. The US government honored Hemanta by conferring him with the citizenship of
Baltimore, Maryland; the first-ever singer of India to get USA citizenship. In the early to mid-
1970s, two major music composers in Bengal, Nachiketa Ghosh and Robin Chatterjee, who had
worked closely with Hemanta, since the early 1950s, died. Simultaneously, music composed by
Hemanta for Bengali films like Phuleswari, Raag Anurag, Ganadebata and Dadar Kirti established
him as the major film music composer in the Bengal movie scene. In 1979, Hemanta re-recorded
some of his earlier works with composer Salil Chowdhury from the 1940s and 1950s. This
album, titled Legend of Glory, vol. 2 was a major commercial success.
In 1980, Hemanta had a heart attack that severely affected his vocal capabilities, especially his
breath control. He continued to record songs in the early eighties, but his voice was a shade of
its rich baritone past. In 1984, Hemanta was felicitated by different organizations, most notably
by the Gramophone Company of India, for completing 50 years in music. That very year
Hemanta released his last album with Gramophone Company of India — a 45 rpm extended play
disc with four non-film songs. Over the next few years, Hemanta released few non-film songs for
small-time companies that had cropped up in the nascent cassette-based music industry. Only a
few of these were commercially successful. He composed music for a handful of Bengali
movies and one Bengali and one Hindi tele-series. However, by this time he had become an
institution, a beloved and revered personality who was a courteous and friendly gentleman. His
philanthropic activities included running a homeopathic hospital in memory of his late father in
their native village in Baharu, in the South 24 Parganas district of West Bengal. He continued to
feature regularly on All India Radio, Doordarshan (TV) and live programs/concerts during this
period.
In a television interview, recorded in the early 1990s, to noted elocutionist Gauri Ghosh, his wife
Bela Mukherjee recalled that she never knew during his lifetime the number of families and
persons he helped to put up financially or otherwise; it was only after his departure that this truth
gradually unveiled.
In 1987, he was nominated for Padmabhushan which he refused politely, having already turned
down a previous offer to receive Padmashree in the 1970s. In this year, he was publicly
felicitated in Netaji Indoor Stadium in Calcutta for completing 50 years in the musical journey,
where, Lata Mangeshkar presented him with the memento on behalf of his fans and admirers.Despite his aging voice, he became the Best Male Singer in 1988 for his rendition in the film
"Lalan Fakir".
In September 1989 he traveled to Dhaka, Bangladesh to receive the Michael Madhusudan Award,
as well as to perform a concert. Immediately after returning from this trip he suffered another
heart attack on 26 September,1989 and died at 11:15 pm in a nursing home in South Calcutta.

Awards
 1956 : Filmfare Best Music Director Award: Nagin
 1971 : National Film Award for Best Male Playback Singer: Nimantran
 1962 : BFJA Best Music Director Award: "Swaralipi": Won
 1963 : BFJA Best Music Director Award (Hindi): "Bees Saal Baad":Won
 1964 : BFJA Best Music Director Award: "Palatak": Won
 1967 : BFJA Best Music Director Award: "Monihar": Won
 1968 : BFJA Best Music Director Award: "Balika Badhu":Won
 1970 : Padma Shri  (Refused)
 1972 : BFJA Best Male Playback Singer Award: Dhannyee Meye: Won
 1975 : BFJA Best Male Playback Singer Award: Phuleswari: Won
 1975 : BFJA Best Music Director Award: "Phuleawari": Won
 1976 : BFJA Best Male Playback Singer Award: Priya Bandhobi: Won
 1986 : National Film Award for Best Male Playback Singer: Lalan Fakir
1986  :Sangeet Natak Akademi Award for Creative and experimental music.
 1986 : BFJA Best Music Director Award: "Bhalobasa Bhalobasa":Won
 1987 : Padma Bhushan  (Refused)
 1987 : BFJA Best Music Director Award: "Pathbhola": Won
 1988 : BFJA Best Music Director Award: "Aagoman": Won
 1985 : Honorary D.Litt. by Visva-Bharati University
 1986 : Sangeet Natak Akademi Award
 1988 : Honorary D.Litt. by The University of Calcutta
 1989 : Michael Madhusudan Award
 2012 : Bangladesh Liberation War Honour, 
 2012 : Friends of Liberation War Honour  (Posthumously)
 1971 : The US government honored Hemanta by conferring him with the citizenship of Baltimore, Maryland; the first-ever singer of India to get USA citizenship.

Death and legacy 
On 26 September 1989, Hemant fell ill after returning from a concert in Dhaka. He died shortly after, due to a massive cardiac arrest. According to his daughter-in-law Moushumi Chatterjee, his last words were "Ki koshto, ki koshto" ('such pain, such pain').

Hemant's legacy still lives on through the songs that he has recorded during his lifetime, as well as music he has composed. Due to the commercial viability of his songs, the Gramophone Company of India (or Saregama) still releases at least one album of his every year, repackaging his older songs.

Discography

English discography (as composer)

Bengali discography (as composer)
Total number of films: 147

Hindi discography (as composer)

Discography in other languages (as a composer)

Discography (as playback singer)

Bengali film songs

Bengali non-film songs

References

Sources
 Hemanta Kumar Mukhopadhyay, "Ananda dhara", Deb Sahitya Kutir Press, Calcutta, 1970.
 A. Rajadhakshya and P. Wilhelm, "An Encyclopedia of Indian Cinema", 2nd ed., British Film Institute, 1999.
 S. Bhattacharya, "Amar gaaner swaralipi", A. Mukherjee Press, Calcutta, 1988.
https://web.archive.org/web/20100108062601/http://www.bfjaawards.com/legacy/pastwin/198952.htm

External links

 

1920 births
1989 deaths
Bengali musicians
Singers from Kolkata
Filmfare Awards winners
Musicians from Varanasi
Asutosh College alumni
University of Calcutta alumni
Bollywood playback singers
Bengali playback singers
Hindi film score composers
20th-century Indian composers
20th-century Indian singers
Best Male Playback Singer National Film Award winners
Indian male film score composers
20th-century Indian male singers
People from Jaynagar Majilpur
Recipients of the Sangeet Natak Akademi Award